Kleczanów Forest is a small Polish forest complex (ca. 5 ha) in the vicinity of Kleczanów village in Sandomierz County, Poland. It is known for featuring an ancient site of 37 Slavic kurgans (burial mounds) 4–10 metres high. 

The complex is surrounded by agricultural fields, and is unique in the whole region. The first burials are believed to have started in the Kleczanów woods in the late Stone Age and continued into the 10th and 11th centuries. The prehistoric cemetery was discovered by Polish archeologists in the 1990s. In pagan times the site could have been a Slavic sacred wood (gaj, Proto-Slavic *gajь 'wood, thicket, bush, grove', see: Slavic mythology, sacred grove), a place where people worshipped and used to bury their relatives. Although the whole surrounding landscape was transformed into farmland, the Kleczanów Woods survived untouched. For 1,000 years the religious community of Kleczanów used to celebrate Pentecost feasts and Whitsun festival there. The spring season, lasting from March till June, was traditionally devoted by Slavs to rebirth ceremonies and communication with dead ancestors (as well as autumn time, conf. Halloween among Germanic people). In early Christian period this pagan habit blended with Catholic feasts.

References

Further reading
 Andrzej Buko, Archeologia Polski wczesnośredniowiecznej ("Archaeology of the Early Middle Ages Poland"), Warszawa 2006, pp. 129–136
 The Archeology of Early Medieval Poland, Leiden-Boston 2008
 Aleksander Gieysztor, Mitologia Słowian ("Mythology of Slavs"),  Warszawa 2006

External links
 "Pagan Cemetery or Holy Grove", website of Prof. Andrzej Buko

Prehistoric sites in Poland
Archaeological sites in Poland
Forests of Poland
Sandomierz County
Buildings and structures in Świętokrzyskie Voivodeship